"A Rapist in Your Path", also known as "The Rapist Is You", is a Chilean feminist performance piece protesting violence against women in 2019. It has been performed in Latin America, the United States, and Europe. Based on the work of Rita Segato, the piece was created by the Valparaíso feminist collective LasTesis.

Lyrics and choreography 
The name of the performance is a reference to the slogan Un amigo en tu camino (lit. A Friend Along Your Path) used by Carabineros de Chile in the 1990s. The lyrics of the original Chilean version of "Un violador en tu camino" include a verse from the Chilean police anthem, "Orden y Patria" (lit. Order and Homeland), which addresses a young girl and tells her that her Carabinero lover is watching over her. Both of these references directly critique the Chilean police for their history of claiming to protect women while using sexual violence against female demonstrators.  The English version of the song, adapted for performances in the United States and other English-speaking regions, omits this verse of the police anthem. 

The squatting motion included in the choreography is a reference to a practice carried out by police against female detainees, in which detainees are forced to strip naked and adopt a squatting position.

Participants frequently dress in "party" clothes to protest practices of victim blaming that shift blame onto victims of sexual assault by focusing on the individual's clothing choices. The lyrics "y la culpa no era mía, ni donde estaba, ni como vestía" ("and it was not my fault, nor where I was, nor how I dressed") communicate the message that women have the right to dress however they choose and occupy public and private spaces without becoming victims of sexual assault or being blamed for the actions of the perpetrator.

The use of blindfolds refers both to victims of eye injuries during the 2019-2020 Chilean protests and to "La Venda Sexy", a torture center in Pinochet-era Chile where state agents would blindfold female political prisoners while subjecting them to sexual violence and other forms of torture.

Performance history

Origins in Chile 
Although the piece was initially planned to be performed in October of 2019, its debut was delayed after protests erupted across the country. “Un violador en tu camino” was first performed in public on 20 November in Plaza Aníbal Pinto in downtown Valparaíso.

On 25 November, in honor of the International Day for the Elimination of Violence against Women, other groups of women performed "Un violador en tu camino" in several locations around Santiago, the Chilean capital. Following the success of these demonstrations, the creators called for women in other countries to perform their own renditions of it.

In the city of Temuco in the South of Chile, indigenous Mapuche women performed a version of "Un violador en tu camino" translated into Mapudungun.

Although the dance was created as a criticism of rape culture and state violence in general, it gained popularity and resonated even more strongly among Chilean women following incidents of sexual violence perpetrated against demonstrators in the October 2019 protests. The creators stated that in the context of these protests, they decided to adapt the piece and dedicate it specifically to the police. The Instituto Nacional de Derechos Humanos (National Human Rights Institute) reported that between 17 October 2019 and 13 March 2020, the organization had initiated legal action on behalf of 282 victims of torture with sexual violence carried out by police and other government agents during the protests. Sexual violence was also used as a form of torture under the military dictatorship that ruled Chile from 1973 to 1990.

Although the piece was not originally intended to be a protest, the female demonstrators who began recreating the performance helped it acquire international fame.

Outside of Chile 
Videos of the performance went viral, spreading across the world. Similar performances took place in Mexico, Colombia, France, Spain, and the United Kingdom. Thousands of women performed the piece at the Zócalo, Mexico City's main square, on 29 November 2019.

As it was performed in Istanbul, Turkey on December 8, 2019, the police interfered and detained several of the dancing protestors. A few days later, female Turkish members of Parliament sang the song in Turkish parliament. The MP, Saliha Sera Kadıgil Sütlü of the Republican People's Party, spoke directly to Minister of the Interior Süleyman Soylu, declaring that "Thanks to you, Turkey is the only country in which you must have (parliamentary) immunity to participate in this protest."

In the United States, in the wake of the MeToo Movement, "Un violador en tu camino" has resonated with ongoing activism against sexual abuse. In January 2020, during the trial of Harvey Weinstein in New York City, demonstrators performed the piece in response to allegations of sexual misconduct by powerful men including Weinstein and Donald Trump. In Miami, the performers specifically named Brett Kavanaugh.

In Bogotá, Colombia, journalists performed an adaptation of the song, changing the lyrics to call out sexism in the press and carrying signs in memory of victims of femicide.

According to a map of documented performances created by GeoChicas, as of 2021, "Un violador en tu camino" has been performed in over 400 locations in over 50 countries.

References

Further reading

 
 

2019 in Chile
Chilean songs
Protest songs
Feminism in Chile
2019–2020 Chilean protests